The Treatment is an American romantic comedy film released in 2006 produced and directed by Oren Rudavsky and starring Chris Eigeman and Famke Janssen.

It is based on a novel with the same title by Daniel Menaker.

Plot
The film begins with Jake Singer (Eigeman) meeting up with Julia (Stephanie March) in an attempt to rekindle their relationship. She, however, informs him that she is recently engaged and has been wanting to call him to tell him.  The wedding will be in Aspen, but she invites him to her pre-wedding party in New York.

Jake, the son of retired physician Arnold Singer (Harris Yulin), is an English teacher and somewhat of a basketball coach at Coventry, a Manhattan private school.  He becomes involved with Allegra Marshall (Famke Janssen) the widow of a wealthy gentleman who died suddenly from a cardiac embolism.

Jake seeks treatment from psychoanalyst Dr. Ernesto Morales (Ian Holm) who frequently surprises Jake in the form of hallucinations attempting to shape or modify his behavior.

Cast
 Chris Eigeman ... Jake Singer
 Famke Janssen ... Allegra Marshall
 Harris Yulin ... Arnold Singer
 Ian Holm ... Dr. Ernesto Morales 
 Stephanie March ... Julia
 Peter Vack ... Ted
 Griffin Newman ... Scott

Awards
The Treatment won in the category of Best New York Narrative at the 2006 Tribeca Film Festival.

John Zorn who composed the score for the film won a MacArthur Foundation, the "Genius" award for his music in 2006. The album, titled Filmworks XVIII: The Treatment features a full score for film by John Zorn. The album was released on Zorn's own label, Tzadik Records.

References

External links

2006 films
2006 romantic comedy films
Films scored by John Zorn
American romantic comedy films
2000s English-language films
2000s American films